The Onion Field is a 1979 American neo-noir crime drama film directed by Harold Becker and written by Joseph Wambaugh, based on his 1973 true crime book of the same name. The film stars John Savage, James Woods and Franklyn Seales, as well as Ted Danson in his film debut.

Woods' performance as Greg Powell was the film's most widely praised element, earning him a Kansas City Film Critics Circle Award and his first Golden Globe nomination.

Plot
In 1963, LAPD detectives Karl Hettinger and Ian Campbell are kidnapped by criminals Greg Powell and Jimmy "Youngblood" Smith. They are driven to an onion field near Bakersfield, where Campbell is shot and killed before Hettinger narrowly escapes as a cloud passes in front of the moon, plunging the onion field into darkness.

Hettinger's eyewitness account leads to the arrest of the two men, who are tried and convicted of first-degree murder. While they languish on death row, Powell and Smith learn how to exploit the legal system, and after a series of appeals, their sentences are reduced to life imprisonment following a court decision abolishing executions in California.

Meanwhile, Hettinger's physical condition and emotional state slowly deteriorate as his failure to act more aggressively on the night of the incident is questioned by those in authority and his fellow officers. Wracked with guilt and remorse, he experiences nightmares, impotence, weight loss, kleptomania and thoughts of suicide.

Cast
 John Savage as Karl Hettinger
 James Woods as Gregory Powell
 Franklyn Seales as Jimmy Smith
 Ted Danson as Ian Campbell
 Ronny Cox as Sgt. Pierce Brooks
 David Huffman as District Attorney Phil Halpin
 Christopher Lloyd as Jailhouse lawyer
 Dianne Hull as Helen Hettinger
 Priscilla Pointer as Chrissie Campbell
 K Callan as Mrs. Powell
 Sandy McPeak as Mr. Powell
 Richard Venture as Det. Glenn Bates
 Lillian Randolph as Nana, Jimmy's Grandma
 Steve Conte as prison guard
 John de Lancie as LAPD Lieutenant #2
 William J. Sanderson as Young Con
 Sandy Ward as Pawnbroker
 Richard Herd as Beat Cop

Production
The film was shot on location in Valencia, Los Angeles, Maricopa and Taft in California. A courtroom of the Superior Court of Los Angeles County was used for the trial scenes. The jury panel was taken to an onion field in Valencia to inspect it as a replica of the scene of the crime.

Wambaugh helped to produce the film and chose the cast and crew, including actor Ted Danson, who made his film debut. Wambaugh reportedly was determined to make a film superior to the 1977 adaptation of his novel The Choirboys, the script of which written by another writer. Wambaugh sued the makers of The Choirboys and his name was removed from the credits.

Release
The Onion Field premiered at the Toronto International Film Festival on September 7, 1979 before opening in New York City on September 19. It grossed $196,716 in its first 5 days from 10 theatres in New York and then expanded to open in Los Angeles and Chicago.

Reception
The movie opened to positive praise as a true story of justice mishandled. Janet Maslin of The New York Times observed: "This is a strong, affecting story but it's also a straggly one, populated by tangential figures and parallel plotlines. The criminals' histories are every bit as convoluted and fascinating as those of the policemen they abducted. Even the courtroom drama is unusually complicated, introducing a new legal team with each new trial.... The film is generally crisp and at times exciting, but it's also full of incidents that are only sketchily explained, and minus the all-important narrative thread that might have provided a clear point of view."

Variety called the film "a highly detailed dramatization" and wrote that James Woods "is chillingly effective, creating a flakiness in the character that exudes the danger of a live wire near a puddle."

Time Out London thought the film was "expertly performed" and added: "It's the usual heavy Wambaugh brew: police procedure closely observed without a trace of romanticism, suggesting simply that life in the force is psychological hell. So far, so good. But that very insistence on authenticity is followed by the film to the detriment of the narrative's dramatic structure; half way through, the whole thing begins to ramble badly. Engrossingly sordid, nevertheless."

The Onion Field holds an 86% rating on Rotten Tomatoes based on 14 reviews.

Accolades

Home media
MGM Home Entertainment released the film as a Region 1 DVD on September 17, 2002. The film is in anamorphic widescreen format with subtitles in English, Spanish and French. Bonus features include commentary by director Harold Becker and a featurette about the making of the film.

References

External links
 
 
 
 

1979 films
1979 crime drama films
American crime drama films
Embassy Pictures films
1970s English-language films
Films about capital punishment
Films about lawyers
Films based on non-fiction books
Films directed by Harold Becker
Films set in 1963
Films set in Los Angeles
Films shot in California
American neo-noir films
1970s American films